The 2016–17 U.S. Virgin Islands Championship was the 14th edition of the competition. The season began on 30 October 2016 and ended on 12 February 2017. The championship itself was a four-team tournament that determined the domestic champion of the U.S. Virgin Islands, based on the top two finishers in the St. Croix and St. Thomas Leagues.

The defending champions, Raymix, successfully defended their title, defeating Helenites, 1–0, in the championship.

Regular season

St. Croix Soccer League 

Helenites and Rovers qualified.

St. Thomas Soccer League 

Raymix and Positive Vibes Victory qualified.

Tournament

Results

Semifinals

Consolation match

Final

References 

U.S. Virgin Islands Championship seasons
United States Virgin Islands
football
football